Edward Wilson Currier (1857–1918) was an American painter. Born in Marietta, Ohio, he was educated at the Chicago Academy of Fine Arts and opened a studio in San Francisco, California. He did oil and watercolor paintings of landscapes, still lifes and maritime scenes. He took trips to Hetch Hetchy and the Yosemite Valley to make sketches for his paintings.

References

1857 births
1918 deaths
People from Marietta, Ohio
Artists from San Francisco
School of the Art Institute of Chicago alumni
American male painters
American landscape painters
American still life painters
19th-century American painters
20th-century American painters
19th-century American male artists
20th-century American male artists